The Royal Canadian Air Force (RCAF) is the air and space force of Canada. Its role is to "provide the Canadian Forces with relevant, responsive and effective airpower". The RCAF is one of three environmental commands within the unified Canadian Armed Forces. As of 2020, the Royal Canadian Air Force consists of 12,074 Regular Force and 1,969 Primary Reserve personnel, supported by 1,518 civilians, and operates 258 manned aircraft and nine unmanned aerial vehicles. Lieutenant-General Eric Kenny is the current commander of the Royal Canadian Air Force and chief of the Air Force Staff.

The Royal Canadian Air Force is responsible for all aircraft operations of the Canadian Forces, enforcing the security of Canada's airspace and providing aircraft to support the missions of the Royal Canadian Navy and the Canadian Army. The RCAF is a partner with the United States Air Force in protecting continental airspace under the North American Aerospace Defense Command (NORAD). The RCAF also provides all primary air resources to and is responsible for the National Search and Rescue Program.

The RCAF traces its history to the Canadian Air Force, which was formed in 1920. The Canadian Air Force was granted royal sanction in 1924 by King George V to form the Royal Canadian Air Force. In 1968, the RCAF was amalgamated with the Royal Canadian Navy and the Canadian Army, as part of the unification of the Canadian Forces. Air units were split between several different commands: Air Defence Command (ADC; interceptors), Air Transport Command (ATC; airlift, search and rescue), Mobile Command (tactical fighters, helicopters), Maritime Command (anti-submarine warfare, maritime patrol), as well as Training Command (TC).

In 1975, some commands (ADC, ATC, TC) were dissolved, and all air units were placed under a new environmental command called simply Air Command (AIRCOM). Air Command reverted to its historic name of "Royal Canadian Air Force" in August 2011.

The Royal Canadian Air Force has served in the Second World War, the Korean War, the Persian Gulf War, as well as several United Nations peacekeeping missions and NATO operations. As a NATO member, the force maintained a presence in Europe during the second half of the 20th century.

History

1920–1945: Pre-unification
The Canadian Air Force (CAF) was established in 1920 as the successor to a short-lived two-squadron Canadian Air Force that was formed during the First World War in Europe. Wing Commander John Scott Williams was tasked in 1921 with organizing the CAF, handing command over later the same year to Air Marshal Lindsay Gordon. The new Canadian Air Force was a branch of the Air Board and was chiefly a training militia that provided refresher training to veteran pilots. Many CAF members also worked with the Air Board's Civil Operations Branch on operations that included forestry, surveying and anti-smuggling patrols. In 1923, the CAF became responsible for all flying operations in Canada, including civil aviation. In 1924, the Canadian Air Force, was granted the royal title, becoming the Royal Canadian Air Force (RCAF). Most of its work was civil in nature; however, in the late 1920s the RCAF evolved into more of a military organization. After budget cuts in the early 1930s, the air force began to rebuild.

World War II
During the Second World War, the RCAF was a major contributor to the British Commonwealth Air Training Plan and was involved in operations in Great Britain, Europe, the north Atlantic, North Africa, southern Asia, and with home defence. 8,864 Americans came north to volunteer for the RCAF, and over 850 died in action. By the end of the war, the RCAF had become the fourth largest allied air force.
During WWII the Royal Canadian Air Force was headquartered in 20-23 Lincolns Inn Fields, London. A commemorative plaque can be found on the outside of the building.

1945–1968
After the war, the RCAF reduced its strength. Because of the rising Soviet threat to the security of Europe, Canada joined NATO in 1949, and the RCAF established No. 1 Air Division RCAF consisting of four wings with three fighter squadrons each, based in France and West Germany. In 1950, the RCAF became involved with the transport of troops and supplies to the Korean War; however, it did not provide RCAF combat units. Members of the RCAF served in USAF units as exchange officers and several flew in combat. Both auxiliary and regular air defence squadrons were run by Air Defence Command. At the same time, the Pinetree Line, the Mid-Canada Line and the DEW Line radar stations, largely operated by the RCAF, were built across Canada because of the growing Soviet nuclear threat. In 1957, Canada and the United States created the joint North American Air Defense Command (NORAD). Coastal defence and peacekeeping also became priorities during the 1950s and 1960s.

1968–present: Unification

In 1968, the Royal Canadian Navy, Royal Canadian Air Force and Canadian Army were amalgamated to form the unified Canadian Forces. This initiative was overseen by then Liberal Defence Minister, Paul Hellyer. The controversial merger maintained several existing organizations and created some new ones: In Europe, No. 1 Canadian Air Group, operated Canadair CF-104 Starfighter nuclear strike/attack and reconnaissance under NATO's 4 ATAF; Air Defence Command: operated McDonnell CF-101 Voodoo interceptors, CIM-10 Bomarc missiles and the SAGE radar system within NORAD; Air Transport Command: provided strategic airlift for the NATO and UN Peacekeeping missions; and Training Command. Aviation assets of the Royal Canadian Navy were combined with the RCAF Canadair CP-107 Argus long-range patrol aircraft under Maritime Command. In 1975, the different commands, and the scattered aviation assets, were consolidated under Air Command (AIRCOM).

In the early 1990s, Canada provided a detachment of CF-18 Hornets for the air defence mission in Operation Desert Shield. The force performed combat air patrols over operations in Kuwait and Iraq, undertook a number of air-to-ground bombing missions, and, on one occasion, attacked an Iraqi patrol boat in the Persian Gulf.

In the late 1990s, Air Command's CF-18 Hornets took part in the Operation Allied Force in Yugoslavia, and in the 2000s, AIRCOM was heavily involved in the Afghanistan War, transporting troops and assets to Kandahar. Later in the decade-long war, AIRCOM set up a purpose-specific air wing, Joint Task Force Afghanistan Air Wing, equipped with several CH-146 Griffon and CH-147 Chinook helicopters, CC-130 Hercules, CU-161 Sperwer and leased CU-170 Heron UAVs in support of the Canadian Forces and ISAF mission. The wing stood down on 18 August 2011.

From 18 March to 1 November 2011, the RCAF was engaged in Operation Mobile, Canada's contribution to Operation Unified Protector in Libya. Seven CF-18 Hornet fighter aircraft and several other aircraft served under Task Force Libeccio as part of the military intervention.

On 16 August 2011, the Government of Canada announced that the name "Air Command" was being changed to the air force's original historic name: Royal Canadian Air Force (along with the change of name of Maritime Command to Royal Canadian Navy and Land Force Command to Canadian Army). The change was made to better reflect Canada's military heritage and align Canada with other key Commonwealth countries whose military units use the royal designation.
The RCAF adopted a new badge in 2013, which is similar to the pre-unification RCAF badge (although placed in the modern frame used for command badges). The Latin motto of Air Command – Sic itur ad astra – which was the motto of the Canadian Air Force when first formed after the First World War (before it became the Royal Canadian Air Force in 1924) was retained. Though traditional insignia for the RCAF was restored in 2015, there has been no restoration of the traditional uniforms or rank structure of the historical service (apart from a rank of "Aviator", which replaced that of "Private" in 2015).

On 17 April 2014, Prime Minister Stephen Harper announced that Canada was dispatching six CF-18s and military personnel to assist NATO in operations in Eastern Europe.

Equipment

Aircraft

The Royal Canadian Air Force has about 430 aircraft in service, making it the third-largest air force in the Americas, after the United States Armed Forces, and the Brazilian Air Force.

Current inventory

Fixed-wing

Rotary wing

 CT-146 are painted all black sports RCAF roundel/wordmark, Canada wordmark with civilian registration numbers.

Leased and contractor aircraft
The Canadian Forces have leased aircraft from vendors to help transport troops and equipment from Canada and other locations in the past decade. Transport aircraft have been leased as required. Despite RCAF marking all aircraft have civilian registration numbers.

Beechcraft B300 Super King Air
 Two aircraft leased from Transwest Air Limited. Used by the Multi-Engine Utility Flight (MEUF) in CFB Trenton. Flown by RCAF pilots, they are used for light transport of personnel and equipment within North America.

Dornier Alpha Jet Type A
 16 aircraft are operated by Discovery Air Defence Services for CATS (Contracted Airborne Training Services) and are based at CFB Cold Lake and CFB Bagotville.

Hawker Hunter F.58
 Twelve civil aircraft are operated by Lortie Aviation, formerly Northern Lights International Airlines Ltd.. Based in CFB Cold Lake; ex-Swiss Air Force jets

Unmanned Aerial Systems (UAS)

RCAF UAS
SAGEM Sperwer
Designated CU-161; entered service in 2003, retired
IAI Heron
3 leased in 2009 for use in Afghanistan; turned over to the Royal Australian Air Force in 2011

Canadian Army/RCN UAS

BAE Systems Silver Fox
Acquired in 2004 by the Canadian Forces Experimentation Centre
Boeing Insitu ScanEagle
Designated CU-165; operated by the Canadian Army 2008-2014 
Elbit Skylark
Designated CU-168; operated by the Canadian Army
AeroVironment RQ-11 Raven
Operated by the Canadian Army
AeroVironment RQ-20 Puma
Acquired in 2018; operated by the Royal Canadian Navy
Prioria Robotics Maveric
Operated by the Canadian Army
Saab Skeldar
Acquired in 2019; operated by the Royal Canadian Navy and CANSOFCOM
Boeing Insitu RQ-21 Blackjack
Designated CU-172; 5 acquired in 2016, operated by the Canadian Army

Future procurement

F-35 Lightning II

The Canadian CF-35 is a proposed variant that would differ from the F-35A through the addition of a drogue parachute and may include an F-35B/C-style refueling probe. In 2012, it was revealed that the CF-35 would employ the same boom refueling system as the F-35A. Following the 2015 Federal Election the Liberal Party, whose campaign had included a pledge to cancel the F-35 procurement, formed a new government and commenced an open competition to replace the existing CF-18 Hornet. On 28 March 2022, the Government of Canada announced that the competition had placed the F-35A first and planned to buy 88 of them. Under procurement rules, the government entered into negotiations with Lockheed Martin. On 9 January 2023, the government of Canada officially ordered 88 F-35As.

MQ-20 Avenger
General Atomics has offered the MQ-20 Avenger stealth unmanned combat air vehicle to Canada as a contender for its Joint Unmanned Surveillance and Target Acquisition System (JUSTAS) armed UAV project. In 2016, the JUSTAS project was prioritized by the Royal Canadian Air Force. The Royal Canadian Air Force has requested that the drones be armed, therefore making the General Atomics Avenger the only suitable contender as Northrop Grumman's RQ-4 'Global Hawk' is unarmed. Following a formal 'Invitation to Qualify' issued by the Government of Canada, only General Atomics and L3 Technologies MAS were selected as being qualified suppliers allowed to submit a bid. Canada will begin to refine the preliminary requirements with General Atomics and L3 Technologies until a formal request for proposals and contract is awarded.

Strategic Tanker Transport Capability
In 2022, two ex-Kuwait Airways Airbus A330-200 were selected to be converted as Airbus A330 MRTT to replace the CC-150 Polaris. The two aircraft will arrive in winter 2023 and converted by Airbus Defence and Space (mainly in Spain and repainted in France).

Weapons and other equipment
Weapons systems are used by the CF-18 Hornet, CP-140 Aurora, CH-146 Griffon and the CH-148 Cyclone.

Retired weapons

Structure 

The commander of the Royal Canadian Air Force, located at National Defence Headquarters in Ottawa, commands and provides strategic direction to the Air Force. The commander of 1 Canadian Air Division and Canadian NORAD Region, based in Winnipeg, is responsible for the operational command and control of Royal Canadian Air Force activities throughout Canada and worldwide. The RCAF's other Air Division, 2 Canadian Air Division, was established in June 2009, and consists of training establishments.

There are 13 wings across Canada, 11 operational and 2 used for training. Wings represent the grouping of various squadrons, both operational and support, under a single tactical commander reporting to the operational commander. Ten wings also include a Canadian Forces base along with other operational and support units.

The rank of general is held when an air officer is serving as chief of the Defence Staff. The commander of the Royal Canadian Air Force holds the rank of lieutenant-general. Divisions are commanded by major-generals. Brigadier-generals are typically second-in-command of a division. Wings are commanded by colonels. Squadrons are commanded by lieutenant-colonels. Majors are typically second-in-command of squadrons, or flight commanders. Captains, lieutenants and second lieutenants are the junior level leaders in RCAF squadrons and headquarters.

Ranks

Commander-in-Chief

Officers

Non-commissioned members

On 1 April 2015, the rank structure and insignia changed. The rank of private was replaced with that of aviator, represented with a propeller for the rank insignia. The previously used term "leading aircraftman" was considered not to be gender neutral. The rank insignia were also changed: enlisted ranks were changed from gold to pearl-grey (silver) and officers rank braid was changed from gold to pearl-grey on black, similar to the pattern used before unification of Canada's armed forces in 1968. A revival of the former rank titles of the RCAF did not occur, however, as such an extensive change was considered "too complicated and confusing". Instead, the current rank titles were retained (with the exception of aviator). The Royal Flying Corps, considered to be a predecessor of the RCAF, used rank titles similar to the existing rank titles of the RCAF.

Symbols

Badge

The badge of the Royal Canadian Air Force consists of:
 St. Edward's Crown
 An eagle superimposed on a circlet
 A compartment of maple leaves
 Motto:  (Latin for 'Such is the pathway to the stars')

Roundels
Roundels used from 1920 until 1945 were usually the same as Royal Air Force roundels although not all variations were used and colours were matched to locally available paints.

Stamps
On 9 November 1984, Canada Post issued "Air Force" as part of the Canadian Forces series. The stamps were designed by Ralph Tibbles, based on an illustration by William Southern. The 32¢ stamps are perforated 12 x 12.5 and were printed by Ashton-Potter Limited.

See also

 List of aircraft of Canada's air forces
Planned Canadian Forces projects
 Royal Canadian Air Force VIP aircraft

References

Further reading
 Douglas, W. A. B. The Creation of a National Air Force: Official History of the Royal Canadian Air Force, v. 2. Toronto: University of Toronto Press (in co-operation with the Department of National Defence), 1986. .

 Milberry, Larry, ed. Sixty Years: The RCAF and CF Air Command 1924–1984. Toronto: Canav Books, 1984. .
 Piggott, Peter. Flying Canucks: Famous Canadian Aviators. Toronto: Hounslow Press, 1996. .
 Piggott, Peter. Flying Canucks II: Pioneers of Canadian Aviation. Toronto: Hounslow Press, 1997. .

External links 

 
 Canadian Air Force aircraft and equipment of Canada(Air recognition)
 "Roundel Round-Up" – Vintage Wings of Canada's history of British and Canadian roundel styles from 1914 through and into the 21st century 
 The Royal Canadian Air Force in the Arctic and Sub-Arctic Manuscript at Dartmouth College Library

 
Federal departments and agencies of Canada
1924 establishments in Canada
Military units and formations established in 1924
Organizations based in Canada with royal patronage
1968 disestablishments in Canada
Military units and formations disestablished in 1968